Kinsealy (officially Kinsaley) is an outer suburb of Dublin in Fingal, Ireland. Kinsealy is on the northside of the city, about 7 km from the centre city, on the Malahide Road, in the former green belt between the suburbs of Balgriffin, Portmarnock and Malahide.

Kinsaley is also the name of the surrounding electoral division and of a civil parish in the ancient barony of Coolock within the historic County Dublin.

Demographics
The 2011 census of Ireland lists the census town of Kinsaley, in the electoral divisions of Kinsaley and Balgriffin, with a population of 214 people. This should not be confused with the census town of Kinsealy–Drinan, which is a suburb of Swords with a population of 5,814 in the townland of Drinan at the north of the electoral division of Kinsaley. The electoral division of Kinsaley also includes parts of the census towns of Swords, Portmarnock, and Malahide. and had a 2011 population of 8,475 people, up from 5,526 in 2006.

History
Samuel Lewis' 1837 Topographical Dictionary describes the parish of Kinsealy as "well cultivated", with a limestone quarry and a holy well.

Charles Haughey lived at Abbeville, a Georgian "big house", for many years, including his time as Taoiseach. Haughey's lavish lifestyle earned him the nickname, "the Squire of Kinsealy".

Amenities
Kinsealy is served by Dublin Bus routes 42, 42n, and 43. It has a Roman Catholic church named after St. Nicholas of Myra, by a secondary road to Portmarnock. The church site originally held the school and this was relocated to its current site in 1952. In addition to the few businesses in Balgriffin, Kinsealy has a small shopping precinct by the Catholic church, a service station and a garden centre with ancillary businesses. A former research station of Teagasc was repurposed as a school.

References

Towns and villages in Fingal
Civil parishes of the barony of Coolock